Hans Eric Mork (1 November 1909 – 2 January 1960) was a South African-born Australian rugby league footballer who played in the 1920s and 1930s. He played in Sydney for the Newtown club (with whom he won the 1933 NSWRFL Premiership), as well as in Newcastle for the Western Suburbs club and elsewhere in country New South Wales.

Background
Mork was born in Port Elizabeth, South Africa.

Playing career
Mork was one of four brothers to play for Newtown. He was graded with the club in 1927 and made it to first grade two years later.

He played eight seasons with Newtown between 1929 and 1938 with a few country captain-coach seasons in between. He was captain-coach of the Newcastle Rugby League's Western Suburbs club in 1932. Mork represented N.S.W. Country Firsts in 1934 whilst playing for Goulburn but returned to Newtown the following season.  

Mork won a premiership with Newtown in 1933 and became club captain in 1935.  Mork also played in Newtown's 1929 grand final loss against South Sydney.

Death
Mork was killed in a car accident on 2 January 1960, aged 50.

References

1909 births
1960 deaths
Australian rugby league coaches
Australian rugby league players
Newtown Jets players
Road incident deaths in New South Wales
Rugby league players from Eastern Cape
South African emigrants to Australia